Biringan is a mythical city that is said to invisibly lie between Gandara, Tarangnan, and Pagsanghan in Samar province of the Philippines.

Legend 

The city is said to be located in the province of Samar. It is also designated as a barangay of Pagsanghan, Samar and Gandara, Samar. According to the local folklore, the population of Biringan comprises supernatural beings: the Engkantos ("enchanted beings"), and their progeny with the humans. The engkantos are described as shapechangers who can take human form. In their human form, they are said to lack a philtrum between their nose and lips. The city is also alleged to contain treasures of gold.

Paranormal claims 

A small number of people claim to have seen the city. Some seafarers have claimed to have seen a "dazzling city of light" on moonless nights, for a few minutes. According to folk stories, most of the people who claim to have seen the city have been the victims of demon possessions.

There were reports of satellite images from a Japanese company that allegedly show brightly lit tracts of lands in the region, which led the Japanese to believe that there are rich deposits of gold and uranium in the suspected area. They began work immediately, setting up a large work site in the town of San Jorge, but mysterious accidents and mishaps plagued the project from the start, forcing the Japanese company to shut down operation and abandon the project completely in an effort to avoid bankruptcy and cut their losses.

References

Visayan mythology
Fictional populated places
Mythological populated places
Urban legends